The Wildlife Monographs is a peer-reviewed scientific journal devoted to the ecology of non-domesticated animal species. It is published by John Wiley & Sons on behalf of The Wildlife Society.

See also 
 Journal of Wildlife Management
 Wildlife Society Bulletin

External links 
 

Publications established in 1958
Ecology journals
English-language journals